Sergio Rodríguez Martínez (born 26 July 1978) is a Spanish former footballer who played as a central midfielder, currently the manager of UD Logroñés.

In a 12-year professional career, he amassed Segunda División totals of 159 matches and 16 goals over six seasons, representing in the competition Lleida, Cádiz, Alavés and Real Sociedad.

Rodríguez started working as a coach in 2017, spending four years at the helm of UD Logroñés.

Playing career
Born in Logroño, La Rioja, Rodríguez began playing football with SRC La Unión, but was unable to appear for the club due to his age. After a period at SR Cantabria, he started his senior career with Peña Real Madrid de Logroño, and went on to represent SD Loyola and CD Logroñés B.

In 2001, after one year at Tercera División side CF Balaguer, Rodríguez joined UE Lleida where he made his professional debut, representing the Catalans in both the second and third divisions. In the 2006–07 season he signed with Cádiz CF in the former level but, unsettled, left after a few months and moved back to Lleida on loan, in the third tier.

Rodríguez continued in division two the following years, with Deportivo Alavés and Real Sociedad. Already a fringe player in his second campaign with the latter, he did appear in 15 games as they returned to La Liga after a three-year absence, being subsequently released.

Coaching career
After retiring at the age of 35, Rodríguez starting working as a coach with his last club, being in charge of the youth sides at UD Logroñés. On 17 November 2016, after Carlos Pouso was fired from the first team in the third division, he was appointed as caretaker. He once again came to the rescue of the latter on 20 March 2017, signing until the end of the season after the dismissal of Rafael Berges.

On 8 May 2017, Rodríguez agreed to a two-year permanent deal at Logroñés. He led them to a first-ever promotion to the second division in 2020, and renewed his contract for a further season on 24 July.

Rodríguez left the Estadio Las Gaunas on 31 May 2021, after the club's immediate relegation.

Managerial statistics

Honours

Player
Lleida
Segunda División B: 2003–04

Real Sociedad
Segunda División: 2009–10

References

External links

1978 births
Living people
Sportspeople from Logroño
Spanish footballers
Footballers from La Rioja (Spain)
Association football midfielders
Segunda División players
Segunda División B players
Tercera División players
CF Balaguer footballers
UE Lleida players
Cádiz CF players
Deportivo Alavés players
Real Sociedad footballers
UD Logroñés players
Spanish football managers
Segunda División managers
Segunda División B managers
UD Logroñés managers